Bungendore is a town in the Queanbeyan Region of New South Wales, Australia, in Queanbeyan-Palerang Regional Council.  It is on the Kings Highway near Lake George, the Molonglo River Valley and the Australian Capital Territory border.  It has become a major tourist centre in recent years, popular with visitors from Canberra and some of it has heritage protection.  It has expanded rapidly in recent years as a dormitory town of Canberra.

History

Prior to European settlement, the area was occupied by the Ngarigo people, whose northernmost lands extended to the southern shore of Lake George and around the base of the steep escarpment lying to the west of what is now Bungendore. 

The first Europeans in the vicinity were members of the exploratory party of Dr Charles Throsby in 1820, who, along with Hamilton Hume, also originally explored the Braidwood area.  In 1824, explorer Allan Cunningham passed through Bungendore.  A year later, the first European settlers arrived. The mail service to Bungendore was introduced in 1837, enhancing the importance of the village and contributing to the proclamation of Bungendore as a "town" in the same year. Also in 1837, the surveyor James Larmer laid out the Georgian-influenced grid town plan of Bungendore.

By 1848, 30 people populated the seven buildings in the town of Bungendore. When the railway arrived on 4 March 1885, the town began to grow more quickly. New buildings appeared rapidly, such as churches, the courthouse/police station, two schools and the post office.

The first post office was built in Bungendore in 1840, an Anglican church c 1843, and the Bungendore Inn in 1847. The latter became a Pooley and Malone staging post.  By 1851, the population was 63.  The 1850s saw at least two other hotels established. A flour mill was built in 1861, St Mary's Roman Catholic Church and two denominational schools in 1862, the courthouse in 1864 and a public school in 1868.  In 1866, local crops grown were recorded as being wheat, oats, barley and potatoes. Tourism is now a major contributor to the economy.

The town remained a railhead from 1885 until the line reached Queanbeyan in 1887. Partly because of the coming railway, the 1880s proved a boom period for the town and the population increased from 270 in 1881, to 700 by 1885. By then, Queanbeyan was emerging as the major town in the area. Bungendore was proclaimed a village for a second time, in 1885, as a consequence of the Crown Lands Act 1884.

In 1894, gold was discovered at Bywong. In 1901, a site known as "Lake George", just to the north of Bungendore and adjacent to Lake George, was proposed as the site for the nation's capital city. This did not eventuate, as the drawcard of Lake George failed to impress the visiting Commissioners of the time.

By 1909 rabbit trapping had become an extremely valuable industry in the area around Bungendore. The town itself had a rabbit-freezing plant that employed 14 workers and over 250 trappers. In the year ending 31 July 1909, over 1.5 million rabbits were frozen at Bungendore.

In 1992 journalist Ian McPhedran wrote that Bungendore's locals and business sector had developed a method of community cooperation superior to most other Australian small towns.

On 29 January 2017 at the Werriwa Wiener Dash, an event held as part of the annual Bungendore Show, Bungendore set the record for the most number of dachshunds in one place outside of a Dog Show with 154 dachshunds in attendance.

Heritage listings 
Bungendore has a number of heritage-listed sites, including:
 Gibraltar Street: Bungendore railway station

Village Green 
Claimed as a 'unique green space' by a local activist group, the area was identified as a "council property being an internal disused area with two dilapidated sheds" by the
Queanbeyan-Palerang Mayor Tim Overall, who clarified that "it would not be accurate to describe it as green space on the main road”.

The car park was completed in 2021 and is often seen brimming with visitors of the many attractions that Bungendore has to offer.

Population
The next most common country of birth was England at 4.8%. 92.7% of people spoke only English at home. The most common responses for religion were No Religion 44.7%, Catholic 23.0% and Anglican 15.9%.

Geography
Bungendore is quite near a hill known as Gibraltar Hill. and is located close to the Great Dividing Range where it traverses the Butmaroo Range, some 10 km to the East, not far from the Butmaroo Homestead.

Bungendore experiences a relatively sunny and dry oceanic climate (Cfb), similar to nearby Goulburn and Canberra. Bungendore's location in a broad valley surrounded by the peaks of the Great Dividing Range to the east often protects the town from inclement weather such as severe thunderstorms, and heavy rainfall arriving from the Tasman Sea. Bungendore is also affected by the strong rain shadow cast by the Brindabella Range, which blocks most precipitation arriving from the west and southwest. Persistent cloud cover and drizzle is rare in Bungendore due to these rain shadows. Most of Bungendore's significant rainfall is therefore derived from systems originating in the northwest. 

Warm to hot summer days are often tempered by afternoon and evening easterly breezes, though the onset in Bungendore is later than in nearby Braidwood, New South Wales. Average maximum temperatures usually reach the mid to high twenties from December to March. Severe heatwaves can occasionally affect Bungendore, since the town is far enough inland to escape the moderating effect of the Tasman Sea. These heatwaves usually occur coincident with a blocking high pressure system in the Tasman Sea, and are most common from late December to mid February. Mid to late January is the warmest time of year on average, similar to most centres in SE Australia. Minimum temperatures in the summer months are usually comfortable thanks to regular easterly breezes, and lower dewpoints compared to the nearby coast. Radiational cooling is efficient in calm conditions on account of Bungendore's valley location. 

The Southeast Australian foehn often affects Bungendore. These strong to occasionally gale force westerly winds are most common in late winter and early spring when the subtropical ridge is at its northernmost position, allowing strong cold fronts and mid latitude westerlies through. Bungendore's position in the lee of the Lake George escarpment and also in the lee of the Brindabella Range can enhance these winds (via the rain shadow wind effect). The often sunny conditions present in Bungendore in a westerly stream also increases mean wind speeds, since the temperature gradient between Bungendore and the surrounding ranges increases. Strong westerly winds can also result from low pressure systems centred in Bass Strait and Tasmania, independent of cold fronts.

Frost is common from late April to mid October whenever conditions are clear and calm; frost is less common during wetter climatic conditions such as during La Nina and negative Indian Ocean Dipole phases. Snow occasionally falls, though usually only in the form of light flurries and rarely settles. Settled snow is somewhat more common on the Lake George escarpment at 800-900 m elevation.

Capital Wind Farm

In 2008, following some community concerns the Capital Wind Farm was established north of Bungendore along Lake George.

Railways

Bungendore railway station is served by three daily NSW TrainLink Xplorer services in each direction operating between Sydney and Canberra.

References 

Towns in New South Wales
Southern Tablelands
Queanbeyan–Palerang Regional Council